The 1972–73 Detroit Red Wings season was the franchise's 47th season of operation in the National Hockey League, 41st season as the Red Wings. The team placed fifth and missed the playoffs.

Offseason

Regular season

Final standings

Schedule and results

Playoffs

Player statistics

Regular season
Scoring

Goaltending

Note: GP = Games played; G = Goals; A = Assists; Pts = Points; +/- = Plus-minus PIM = Penalty minutes; PPG = Power-play goals; SHG = Short-handed goals; GWG = Game-winning goals;
      MIN = Minutes played; W = Wins; L = Losses; T = Ties; GA = Goals against; GAA = Goals-against average;  SO = Shutouts;

Awards and records

Transactions

Draft picks
Detroit's draft picks at the 1972 NHL Amateur Draft held at the Queen Elizabeth Hotel in Montreal, Quebec.

Farm teams

See also
1972–73 NHL season

References

Detroit
Detroit
Detroit Red Wings seasons
Detroit Red Wings
Detroit Red Wings